Cychrus roeschkei is a species of ground beetle in the subfamily of Carabinae. It was described by Heller in 1923.

References

roeschkei
Beetles described in 1923